Zombie and the Ghost Train is a 1991 Finnish film directed by Mika Kaurismäki.  It focuses on Antti (aka Zombie), a loner who loves performing music but leads a miserable life otherwise.

Cast
 Silu Seppälä as Zombie
 Marjo Leinonenas Marjo
 Matti Pellonpää as Harri
 Vieno Saaristo as Äiti
 Juhani Niemelä as Isä

Reception 
Janet Maslin of The New York Times wrote, "Mr. Kaurismaki is more successful with wry, atmospheric touches than with efforts to find emotional intensity in Zombie's plight."  Kevin Thomas wrote, "It is as fine as anything either of the talented, charismatic Kaurismaki brothers has ever done. It is a rueful, often darkly funny portrait".

See also 
 Docufiction
 List of docufiction films

References

External links

 

1991 films
Finnish comedy-drama films
Films set in Finland
Films directed by Mika Kaurismäki